A toro de fuego ("fire bull") is a festive activity in Spain, where a metal frame resembling a bull, with fireworks attached to it, is set alight, and then the person carrying the frame runs around town at night as if chasing people in the streets. Participants dodge the bull when it comes close, especially because the burning fireworks set off sparks that can cause small burns in people's skin or clothes. This activity is held in a number of Spanish towns during their local festivals. It is possible that this custom originated in the Toro embolado, in which a real bull is involved.

A similar custom in Ecuador and other Latin American countries is known as vaca loca ("crazy cow").

References 

Bullfighting
Festivals in Spain
Festivals in Ecuador
Festivals in Peru
Fireworks events
Traditions involving fire